The Sarangani Provincial Board is the Sangguniang Panlalawigan (provincial legislature) of the Philippine province of Sarangani  .

The members are elected via plurality-at-large voting: the province is divided into two districts, the first district sending four members, and the second district sending six members to the provincial board; the number of candidates the electorate votes for and the number of winning candidates depends on the number of members their district sends.  The vice governor is the ex officio presiding officer, and only votes to break ties. The vice governor is elected via the plurality voting system province-wide.

The districts used in appropriation of members is not coextensive with the legislative district of Sarangani; unlike congressional representation which is at-large, Sarangani is divided into two districts for representation in the Sangguniang Panlalawigan.

Aside from the regular members, the board also includes the provincial federation presidents of the Liga ng mga Barangay (ABC, from its old name "Association of Barangay Captains"), the Sangguniang Kabataan (SK, youth councils) and the Philippine Councilors League (PCL). Sarangani's provincial board also has a reserved seat for its indigenous people (IPMR).

Apportionment

List of members

Current members 
These are the members after the 2022 local elections and 2018 barangay and SK elections:

 Vice Governor: Elmer de Peralta (PCM)

References 

Politics of Sarangani
Provincial boards in the Philippines